Henry Woods may refer to:

 Henry Woods (Pennsylvania politician) (1764–1826), American congressman
 Henry Felix Woods (1843–1929), British admiral
 Henry Woods (geologist) (1868–1952), British geologist
 Henry Woods (painter) (1846–1921), English painter
 Henry Woods (judge) (1918–2002), American judge
 Henry Woods (MP) (1822–1882), English cotton manufacturer, colliery owner and Liberal MP
 Henry George Woods (1842–1915), Anglican clergyman and academic
 Henry J. B. Woods (1842–1914), merchant and political figure in Newfoundland
 Henry Woods (British Army officer) (1924–2019), British general
 Henry Woods (footballer) (born 1999), Gillingham footballer

See also
 Harry Woods (disambiguation)
 Henry Wood (disambiguation)